Beardsley Avenue Historic District is a national historic district located at Elkhart, Elkhart County, Indiana. The district encompasses 41 contributing buildings, 3 contributing sites, 2 contributing structures, and 2 contributing objects in a predominantly residential section of Elkhart.  It was developed after 1848, and includes residences in a number of architectural styles including Prairie School and Beaux Arts.  Located in the district are the separately listed Dr. Havilah Beardsley House and Ruthmere Mansion.  Other notable contributing resources are Island Park, Beardsley Park, the Main Street Memorial Bridge, St. Paul's Methodist Church, and the Best House.

It was added to the National Register of Historic Places in 2003.

References

External links

Historic districts on the National Register of Historic Places in Indiana
Beaux-Arts architecture in Indiana
Buildings and structures in Elkhart, Indiana
Historic districts in Elkhart County, Indiana
National Register of Historic Places in Elkhart County, Indiana